The All Star Music is an independent music label that manages artists in Russia, the CIS, Europe and United States.

Among the artists who have released their releases on the label and collaborate with the company are A-Studio, Soso Pavliashvili, Mitya Fomin, Uma2rman, Jasmin, Diana Gurtskaya, Anna Sedokova, AISEL.

References

External links 
 Official website
 Website
 Telegram

Russian record labels